Dorcadion kalashiani is a species of beetle in the family Cerambycidae. It was described by Mikhail Leontievich Danilevsky in 1996. It is known from Iran.

References

kalashiani
Beetles described in 1996